Günther Hell (born 30 August 1978) is an Italian ice hockey player. He competed in the men's tournament at the 2006 Winter Olympics.

References

1978 births
Living people
Olympic ice hockey players of Italy
Ice hockey players at the 2006 Winter Olympics
Sportspeople from Merano